Patrick Barry Sullivan (August 29, 1912 – June 6, 1994) was an American movie actor who appeared in over 100 movies from the 1930s to the 1980s, notably The Bad and the Beautiful opposite Kirk Douglas.
 
Ronald Bergan wrote in The Guardian in 1994: "Second division Hollywood actors like Barry Sullivan ... are usually faintly praised for being reliable or solid. However, when given the chance, Sullivan was a powerful, often baleful presence on screen, providing more pleasure than many more touted stars. "

Biography

Early years
Born in New York City, Sullivan was a law student at New York University and Temple University. He fell into acting when in college playing semi-pro football. He was later a department store buyer.

Career

Broadway stage, film shorts and radio
Sullivan's first appearance on Broadway was in I Want a Policeman in 1936. That year he was also in R.C. Sheriff's St Helena.
Sullivan appeared in shorts such as Strike! You're Out (1936), Broker's Follies (1937), Dime a Dance (1937) (alongside Imogene Coca, June Allyson and Danny Kaye), Dates and Nuts (1937), and Hi-Ho Hollywood (1937). 
He returned to Broadway with roles in All That Glitters (1938) and Eye on the Sparrow (1938) (with a young Montgomery Clift). He received attention when he joined the cast of the long running The Man Who Came to Dinner (1939) as Bert Jefferson. He was also in Mr Big (1941), Ring Around Elizabeth (1941) and Johnny 2 X 4 (1942). Sullivan appeared with Bette Davis on stage in 1960 in The World of Carl Sandburg as a substitute for her husband Gary Merrill.
In 1950, Sullivan replaced Vincent Price in the role of Leslie Charteris' Simon Templar on the NBC Radio show The Saint. Sullivan lasted only two episodes before the show was cancelled.

Movies
Sullivan had a small role in the Universal serial The Green Hornet Strikes Again! (1941).

Sullivan had a supporting part in High Explosive (1943) for Pine-Thomas Productions, who released through Paramount, and he was the second male lead in The Woman of the Town (1943) with Claire Trevor.

He was signed to a long term contract by Paramount, who gave him a good support role in an "A" film, the musical Lady in the Dark (1944) with Ginger Rogers. He supported Dorothy Lamour in Rainbow Island (1944) and Alan Ladd and Loretta Young in And Now Tomorrow (1944), and was one of many Paramount names in Duffy's Tavern (1945). He supported Dennis O'Keefe and Marie McDonald in the comedy, Getting Gertie's Garter (1945). 

Then he went to Monogram Pictures for Suspense (1946), the most expensive film that studio had made to date, produced by the King Brothers; Sullivan was second billed to Belita. Monogram were delighted with his work; Sullivan obtained a release from his Paramount contract and signed a three picture deal with Monogram. Sullivan supported Brian Aherne and Constance Bennett in Smart Woman (1948) for Bennett's company, releasing through Monogram (as Allied Artists). He received top billing for a Western from the King Brothers and Monogram, Bad Men of Tombstone (1949).

MGM signed Sullivan to a contract, and he played supporting roles in Tension (1950), The Outriders (1950), Nancy Goes to Rio (1950), A Life of Her Own (1950), and Grounds for Marriage (1951). He was upped to leading man for Cause for Alarm! (1951) with Young and Payment on Demand (1951) with Bette Davis at RKO but was back down the cast list for Three Guys Named Mike (1951), Mr. Imperium (1951), and Inside Straight (1951). He was given top billing in No Questions Asked (1951), a role originally meant for Gable. 
 
Sullivan played the lead in a series of lower budgeted films noir: Loophole (1954) for Allied Artists, Playgirl (1954) at Universal, and The Miami Story (1954) for Sam Katzman. He went back to MGM for a support role in Her Twelve Men (1954).

In June 1954 he returned to Broadway to replace Henry Fonda in The Caine Mutiny Court-Martial. He went to Paramount to support James Stewart in Strategic Air Command (1955) and guested on shows like General Electric Theater, Studio One in Hollywood, Climax! and Ford Star Jubilee (reprising his Caine Mutiny performance).

Sullivan was leading man to Joan Crawford in Queen Bee (1955), Claudette Colbert in Texas Lady (1955), Barbara Stanwyck in The Maverick Queen (1956) and Doris Day in Julie (1956).

In 1956 he was in Too Late the Phalarope on Broadway which had a short run.

He had the lead in a low budget Western Dragoon Wells Massacre (1957), The Way to the Gold (1957), and Sam Fuller's Forty Guns (1957) with Stanwyck. He was Lana Turner's leading man in Another Time, Another Place (1958) and played star roles in some films for Allied Artists, including Wolf Larsen (1958), an adaptation of The Sea Wolf wherein  Sullivan played the title role, and The Purple Gang (1959), a gangster film.

His last film was The Last Straw in 1987.

Television
In the 1953-1954 television season, Sullivan appeared with other celebrities as a musical judge on Jukebox Jury. His first starring television role was a syndicated adaptation of the radio series The Man Called X for Ziv Television in 1956-1957 as secret agent Ken Thurston. In the 1957-1958 season, Sullivan starred in the adventure/drama television series Harbormaster. He played a commercial ship's captain, David Scott, and Paul Burke played his partner Jeff Kittridge in five episodes of the series, which aired first on CBS and then ABC under the revised title Adventure at Scott Island. He directed some episodes as well as episodes of Highway Patrol, which was made by Ziv, who did Harbourmaster. He continued to make guest appearances on shows like Alfred Hitchcock Presents, Pursuit, Playhouse 90, The DuPont Show with June Allyson, The United States Steel Hour and Westinghouse Desilu Playhouse, and he was in a TV adaptation of My Three Angels.  Barry Sullivan starred in a western TV show, The Tall Man ...(1960-1962)  Sullivan starred in the television series The Road West, as family patriarch Ben Pride. He guest starred on Perry Mason, Mission: Impossible, Bonanza, Garrison's Gorillas, Mannix, The Man from U.N.C.L.E., That Girl, and It Takes a Thief.  Barry Sullivan also appeared in the first season of Barnaby Jones; episode titled, "A Little Glory, A Little Death" which initially aired April 29, 1973.

He has two stars on the Hollywood Walk of Fame: one at 1500 Vine St. for his work in television, and another at 6160 Hollywood Blvd. for motion pictures.

Personal life
Sullivan was a Democratic Party activist and an advocate for the mentally disabled.  He was married three times and had three children. Marie Brown (married 1937, divorced 1957), a Broadway actress, was mother to both Jenny and John Sullivan. 

He married model and actress Gita Hall in 1958, and they were divorced June 1961. The couple's daughter, Patsy, became the youngest model ever, at 12 years old, to sign a contract with a cosmetic company. Patsy provided her parents with six grandchildren via her romance and marriage to songwriter Jimmy Webb. Sullivan's third marriage to Desiree Sumara produced no children and ended in divorce in 1965. Sullivan's last public romance was with actress Irene Kelly.

His daughter Jenny Sullivan wrote the play J for J (Journals for John) after she found a packet of unsent letters (in 1995) written by Barry decades earlier to her older brother Johnny, who was mentally disabled. The play premiered on October 20, 2001. John Ritter, who in real life had a handicapped brother, played Johnny, Jenny played herself, and actor Jeff Kober portrayed Sullivan.

Death
Sullivan died at age 81 of respiratory failure on June 6, 1994.

Partial filmography

The Green Hornet Strikes Again! (1940) as Thug in Back Seat
High Explosive (1943) as Mike Douglas
The Woman of the Town (1943) as King Kennedy
Lady in the Dark (1944) as Dr. Brooks
Rainbow Island (1944) as Ken Masters
And Now Tomorrow (1944) as Jeff Stoddard
Duffy's Tavern (1945) as Danny Murphy
Getting Gertie's Garter (1945) as Ted Dalton
Suspense (1946) as Joe Morgan
Framed (1947) as Steve Price
The Gangster (1947) as Shubunka
Smart Woman (1948) as Frank McCoy
Bad Men of Tombstone (1949) as Tom Horn
Any Number Can Play (1949) as Tycoon
The Great Gatsby (1949) as Tom Buchanan
Tension (1950) as Lt. Collier Bonnabel
The Outriders (1950) as Jesse Wallace
Nancy Goes to Rio (1950) as Paul Berten
A Life of Her Own (1950) as Lee Gorrance
Grounds for Marriage (1951) as Chris Bartlett
Payment on Demand (1951) as David Anderson Ramsey
Three Guys Named Mike (1951) as Mike Tracy
Inside Straight (1951) as Johnny Sanderson
Mr. Imperium (1951) as Paul Hunter
Cause for Alarm! (1951) as George Z. Jones
No Questions Asked (1951) as Steve Keiver
The Unknown Man (1951) as Joe Bucknor
Skirts Ahoy! (1952) as Lt. Cmdr. Paul Elcott
The Bad and the Beautiful (1952) as Fred Amiel
Jeopardy (1953) as Doug Stilwin
Cry of the Hunted (1953) as Lt. Tunner
A Slight Case of Larceny (1953) as Radio Stock Quoter (voice, uncredited)
China Venture (1953) as Cmdr. Bert Thompson
Loophole (1954) as Mike Donovan
Playgirl (1954) as Mike Marsh
The Miami Story (1954) as Mick Flagg aka Mike Pierce
Her Twelve Men (1954) as Richard Y. Oliver, Sr.
Strategic Air Command (1955) as Lt. Col. Rocky Samford
Queen Bee (1955) as Avery Phillips
Texas Lady (1955) as Chris Mooney
The Maverick Queen (1956) as Jeff Younger
Julie (1956) as Cliff Henderson
Forty Guns (1957) as Griff Bonell
The Way to the Gold (1957) as Marshal Hannibal
Dragoon Wells Massacre (1957) as Link Ferris
Another Time, Another Place (1958) as Carter Reynolds
Wolf Larsen (1958) as Wolf Larsen
The Purple Gang (1959) as Police Lt. William P. Harley
Seven Ways from Sundown (1960) as Jim Flood
Light in the Piazza (1962) as Noel Johnson
A Gathering of Eagles (1963) as Col. Bill Fowler
Pyro... The Thing Without a Face (1964) as Vance Pierson
Man in the Middle (1964) as Gen. Kempton
Stage to Thunder Rock (1964) as Sheriff Horne
My Blood Runs Cold (1965) as Julian Merriday
Harlow (1965) as Marino Bello
Planet of the Vampires (1965) as Capt. Mark Markary
The Poppy Is Also a Flower (1966) as Chasen
Intimacy (1966) as Walter Nicholson
An American Dream (1966) as Police Lt. G. Roberts
Mission: Impossible (1967) as Alex Lowell
Buckskin (1968) as Chaddock
How to Steal the World (1968) as Dr. Robert Kingsley
That Girl (1968, TV Series) as himself
It Takes All Kinds (1969) as Orville Benton
Shark! (1969) as Prof. Dan Mallare
Tell Them Willie Boy Is Here (1969) as Ray Calvert
The Arrangement (1969) as Chet Collier (uncredited)
The Immortal (1969–1970, TV Series) as Jordan Braddock
The High Chaparral (1970) as Dan Casement
Kung Fu (1972) pilot movie, as Dillon
Savage (1973) as Judge Daniel Stern
Pat Garrett and Billy the Kid (1973) as Chisum
Hurricane (1974) as Hank Stoddard
Earthquake (1974) as Stockle
Take a Hard Ride (1975) as Kane
The 'Human' Factor (1975) as Edmonds
Violent Naples (1976) as 'O' Generale
Survival (1976) as Barry
Grand Jury (1976) as Don Bentine
Oh, God! (1977) as Bishop Reardon
The Washington Affair (1977) as Walter Nicholson
The Bastard (1978) as Abraham Ware
Caravans (1978) as Richardson
The Last Straw (1987) (final film role)

Radio appearances

In 1950 Barry Sullivan filled in for Vincent Price (delayed in Paris) as The Saint (The Ghost that Giggled, Sept 17, 1950)

References

External links

Barry Sullivan as The Saint

1912 births
1994 deaths
Male actors from New York City
American male film actors
American male stage actors
American male radio actors
Temple University alumni
New York University School of Law alumni
20th-century American male actors
Metro-Goldwyn-Mayer contract players
Western (genre) television actors